"Kern River" is a song written and recorded by American country music artist Merle Haggard backed by The Strangers.  It was released in July 1985 as the only single and title track from his album Kern River.  The song peaked at number 10 on the Billboard Hot Country Singles chart.

Content
The song grimly recounts the story of the singer's girlfriend drowning in the Kern River, California. In the 2013 biography Merle Haggard: The Running Kind writer David Cantwell calls the track "a scary record" that "screamed quiet and startled you alive."

Personnel
Merle Haggard– vocals, guitar, fiddle

The Strangers:
Roy Nichols - guitar
Norm Hamlet - steel guitar
Tiny Moore - fiddle, mandolin
Mark Yeary - keyboards
Dennis Hromek - bass
Biff Adams - drums
Jim Belkin - fiddle

Chart performance

Covers
"Kern River" was covered by Dave Alvin on his 2006 album West of the West, and by Emmylou Harris on her 2008 album All I Intended to Be.

References

Merle Haggard songs
Emmylou Harris songs
1985 singles
1985 songs
Epic Records singles
Kern River
Songs written by Merle Haggard